The 58th Guldbagge Awards ceremony, presented by the Swedish Film Institute, honoring the best Swedish films of 2022 and took place on 23 January 2023 at Cirkus in Stockholm. The ceremony was televised by SVT, and was hosted by television presenter Parisa Amiri.

Triangle of Sadness won a leading six awards out of its leading nine nominations.

Winners and nominees 

The majority of the nominees for the 58th Guldbagge Awards were announced on 15 December 2022.

However, the finalists for the Guldbagge Audience Award were announced on 9 January 2023, whereas the Guldbagge Honorary Award and Gullspiran have no nominees, and the recipients of these awards were revealed along with the other winners at the gala.

Winners are listed first and highlighted in boldface.

Films with multiple nominations and awards

References

External links 
 

2022 in Swedish cinema
2022 film awards
Guldbagge Awards ceremonies
2020s in Stockholm